Wayne DeAtley (born November 21, 1958) is an American bobsledder. He competed in the two man event at the 1984 Winter Olympics.

References

1958 births
Living people
American male bobsledders
Olympic bobsledders of the United States
Bobsledders at the 1984 Winter Olympics
People from Takoma Park, Maryland